In mathematics, a complex number is an element of a number system that extends the real numbers with a specific element denoted , called the imaginary unit and satisfying the equation ; every complex number can be expressed in the form , where  and  are real numbers. Because no real number satisfies the above equation,  was called an imaginary number by René Descartes. Despite the historical nomenclature "imaginary", complex numbers are regarded in the mathematical sciences as just as "real" as the real numbers and are fundamental in many aspects of the scientific description of the natural world.

Complex numbers allow solutions to all polynomial equations, even those that have no solutions in real numbers. More precisely, the fundamental theorem of algebra asserts that every non-constant polynomial equation with real or complex coefficients has a solution which is a complex number. For example, the equation

Addition, subtraction and multiplication of complex numbers can be naturally defined by using the rule  combined with the associative, commutative, and distributive laws. Every nonzero complex number has a multiplicative inverse. This makes the complex numbers a field that has the real numbers as a subfield.

This standard basis makes the complex numbers a Cartesian plane, called the complex plane. This allows a geometric interpretation of the complex numbers and their operations, and conversely expressing in terms of complex numbers some geometric properties and constructions. For example, the real numbers form the real line which is identified to the horizontal axis of the complex plane. The complex numbers of absolute value one form the unit circle. The addition of a complex number is a translation in the complex plane, and the multiplication by a complex number is a similarity centered at the origin. The complex conjugation is the reflection symmetry with respect to the real axis. The complex absolute value is a Euclidean norm.

In summary, the complex numbers form a rich structure that is simultaneously an algebraically closed field, a commutative algebra over the reals, and a Euclidean vector space of dimension two.

Definition

For example,  is a complex number.

This way, a complex number is defined as a polynomial with real coefficients in the single indeterminate , for which the relation  is imposed. Based on this definition, complex numbers can be added and multiplied, using the addition and multiplication for polynomials.

The real number  is called the real part of the complex number ; the real number  is called its imaginary part.

Formally, the complex numbers are defined as the quotient ring of the polynomial ring in the indeterminate , by the ideal generated by the polynomial  (see below).

Notation

A real number  can be regarded as a complex number , whose imaginary part is 0. A purely imaginary number  is a complex number , whose real part is zero.

Since the multiplication of the indeterminate  and a real is commutative in polynomials with real coefficients, the polynomial  may be written as  This is often expedient for imaginary parts denoted by expressions, for example, when  is a radical.

Visualization

A complex number  can thus be identified with an ordered pair  of real numbers, which in turn may be interpreted as coordinates of a point in a two-dimensional space. The most immediate space is the Euclidean plane with suitable coordinates, which is then called complex plane or Argand diagram, named after Jean-Robert Argand. Another prominent space on which the coordinates may be projected is the two-dimensional surface of a sphere, which is then called Riemann sphere.

Cartesian complex plane
The definition of the complex numbers involving two arbitrary real values immediately suggests the use of Cartesian coordinates in the complex plane. The horizontal (real) axis is generally used to display the real part, with increasing values to the right, and the imaginary part marks the vertical (imaginary) axis, with increasing values upwards.

A charted number may be viewed either as the coordinatized point or as a position vector from the origin to this point. The coordinate values of a complex number  can hence be expressed in its Cartesian, rectangular, or algebraic form.

Notably, the operations of addition and multiplication take on a very natural geometric character, when complex numbers are viewed as position vectors: addition corresponds to vector addition, while multiplication (see below) corresponds to multiplying their magnitudes and adding the angles they make with the real axis. Viewed in this way, the multiplication of a complex number by  corresponds to rotating the position vector counterclockwise by a quarter turn (90°) about the origin—a fact which can be expressed algebraically as

Polar complex plane

Modulus and argument
An alternative option for coordinates in the complex plane is the polar coordinate system that uses the distance of the point  from the origin, and the angle subtended between the positive real axis and the line segment  in a counterclockwise sense. This leads to the polar form 

The absolute value (or modulus or magnitude) of a complex number  is

If  is a real number (that is, if ), then . That is, the absolute value of a real number equals its absolute value as a complex number.

By Pythagoras' theorem, the absolute value of a complex number is the distance to the origin of the point representing the complex number in the complex plane.

As with the modulus, the argument can be found from the rectangular form —by applying the inverse tangent to the quotient of imaginary-by-real parts. By using a half-angle identity, a single branch of the arctan suffices to cover the range  of the -function, and avoids a more subtle case-by-case analysis

Normally, as given above, the principal value in the interval  is chosen. If the arg value is negative, values in the range  or  can be obtained by adding . Hence, the arg function is sometimes considered as multivalued. The polar angle for the complex number 0 is indeterminate, but arbitrary choice of the polar angle 0 is common.

The value of  equals the result of atan2:

Together,  and  give another way of representing complex numbers, the polar form, as the combination of modulus and argument fully specify the position of a point on the plane. Recovering the original rectangular co-ordinates from the polar form is done by the formula called trigonometric form

Using Euler's formula this can be written as

Using the  function, this is sometimes abbreviated to

In angle notation, often used in electronics to represent a phasor with amplitude  and phase , it is written as

Complex graphs

When visualizing complex functions, both a complex input and output are needed. Because each complex number is represented in two dimensions, visually graphing a complex function would require the perception of a four dimensional space, which is possible only in projections. Because of this, other ways of visualizing complex functions have been designed.

In domain coloring the output dimensions are represented by color and brightness, respectively. Each point in the complex plane as domain is ornated, typically with color representing the argument of the complex number, and brightness representing the magnitude. Dark spots mark moduli near zero, brighter spots are farther away from the origin, the gradation may be discontinuous, but is assumed as monotonous. These plots are called color wheel graphs. This provides a simple way to visualize the functions without losing information.

History

The solution in radicals (without trigonometric functions) of a general cubic equation, when all three of its roots are real numbers, contains the square roots of negative numbers, a situation that cannot be rectified by factoring aided by the rational root test, if the cubic is irreducible; this is the so-called  casus irreducibilis ("irreducible case"). This conundrum led Italian mathematician Gerolamo Cardano to conceive of complex numbers in around 1545 in his Ars Magna, though his understanding was rudimentary; moreover he later dismissed complex numbers as "subtle as they are useless". Cardano did use imaginary numbers, but described using them as “mental torture.”  This was prior to the use of the graphical complex plane. Cardano and other Italian mathematicians, notably Scipione del Ferro, in the 1500s created an algorithm for solving cubic equations which generally had one real solution and two solutions containing an imaginary number. Since they ignored the answers with the imaginary numbers, Cardano found them useless.

Work on the problem of general polynomials ultimately led to the fundamental theorem of algebra, which shows that with complex numbers, a solution exists to every polynomial equation of degree one or higher. Complex numbers thus form an algebraically closed field, where any polynomial equation has a root.

Many mathematicians contributed to the development of complex numbers. The rules for addition, subtraction, multiplication, and root extraction of complex numbers were developed by the Italian mathematician Rafael Bombelli. A more abstract formalism for the complex numbers was further developed by the Irish mathematician William Rowan Hamilton, who extended this abstraction to the theory of quaternions.

Negative quantities were not conceived of in Hellenistic mathematics and Hero merely replaced it by its positive 

The impetus to study complex numbers as a topic in itself first arose in the 16th century when algebraic solutions for the roots of cubic and quartic polynomials were discovered by Italian mathematicians (see Niccolò Fontana Tartaglia, Gerolamo Cardano). It was soon realized (but proved much later) that these formulas, even if one were interested only in real solutions, sometimes required the manipulation of square roots of negative numbers. As an example, Tartaglia's formula for a cubic equation of the form  gives the solution to the equation  as

At first glance this looks like nonsense. Of course this particular equation can be solved at sight but it does illustrate that when general formulas are used to solve cubic equations with real roots then, as later mathematicians showed rigorously, the use of complex numbers is unavoidable. Rafael Bombelli was the first to address explicitly these seemingly paradoxical solutions of cubic equations and developed the rules for complex arithmetic trying to resolve these issues.

The term "imaginary" for these quantities was coined by René Descartes in 1637, who was at pains to stress their unreal nature

Even so, Euler considered it natural to introduce students to complex numbers much earlier than we do today. In his elementary algebra text book, Elements of Algebra, he introduces these numbers almost at once and then uses them in a natural way throughout.

In the 18th century complex numbers gained wider use, as it was noticed that formal manipulation of complex expressions could be used to simplify calculations involving trigonometric functions. For instance, in 1730 Abraham de Moivre noted that the identities relating trigonometric functions of an integer multiple of an angle to powers of trigonometric functions of that angle could be re-expressed by the following de Moivre's formula:

In 1748, Euler went further and obtained Euler's formula of complex analysis:

by formally manipulating complex power series and observed that this formula could be used to reduce any trigonometric identity to much simpler exponential identities.

The idea of a complex number as a point in the complex plane (above) was first described by Danish–Norwegian mathematician Caspar Wessel in 1799, although it had been anticipated as early as 1685 in Wallis's A Treatise of Algebra.

Wessel's memoir appeared in the Proceedings of the Copenhagen Academy but went largely unnoticed. In 1806 Jean-Robert Argand independently issued a pamphlet on complex numbers and provided a rigorous proof of the fundamental theorem of algebra. Carl Friedrich Gauss had earlier published an essentially topological proof of the theorem in 1797 but expressed his doubts at the time about "the true metaphysics of the square root of −1". It was not until 1831 that he overcame these doubts and published his treatise on complex numbers as points in the plane, largely establishing modern notation and terminology:

If one formerly contemplated this subject from a false point of view and therefore found a mysterious darkness, this is in large part attributable to clumsy terminology. Had one not called +1, -1,  positive, negative, or imaginary (or even impossible) units, but instead, say, direct, inverse, or lateral units, then there could scarcely have been talk of such darkness.

In the beginning of the 19th century, other mathematicians discovered independently the geometrical representation of the complex numbers: Buée, Mourey, Warren, Français and his brother, Bellavitis.

The English mathematician G.H. Hardy remarked that Gauss was the first mathematician to use complex numbers in 'a really confident and scientific way' although mathematicians such as Norwegian Niels Henrik Abel and Carl Gustav Jacob Jacobi were necessarily using them routinely before Gauss published his 1831 treatise.

Augustin-Louis Cauchy and Bernhard Riemann together brought the fundamental ideas of complex analysis to a high state of completion, commencing around 1825 in Cauchy's case.

The common terms used in the theory are chiefly due to the founders.

Later classical writers on the general theory include Richard Dedekind, Otto Hölder, Felix Klein, Henri Poincaré, Hermann Schwarz, Karl Weierstrass and many others. Important work (including a systematization) in complex multivariate calculus has been started at beginning of the 20th century. Important results have been achieved by Wilhelm Wirtinger in 1927.

Relations and operations

Equality

Ordering
Unlike the real numbers, there is no natural ordering of the complex numbers. In particular, there is no linear ordering on the complex numbers that is compatible with addition and multiplication. Hence, the complex numbers do not have the structure of an ordered field. Thus, complex numbers are naturally thought of as existing on a two-dimensional plane.

Conjugate

This unary operation on complex numbers cannot be expressed by applying only their basic operations addition, subtraction, multiplication and division.

Geometrically,  is the "reflection" of  about the real axis. Conjugating twice gives the original complex number

which makes this operation an involution. The reflection leaves both the real part and the magnitude of  unchanged, that is
 and 

The imaginary part and the argument of a complex number  change their sign under conjugation

For details on argument and magnitude, see the section on Polar form.

The product of a complex number  and its conjugate is known as the absolute square. It is always a non-negative real number and equals the square of the magnitude of each:

This property can be used to convert a fraction with a complex denominator to an equivalent fraction with a real denominator by expanding both numerator and denominator of the fraction by the conjugate of the given denominator. This process is sometimes called "rationalization" of the denominator (although the denominator in the final expression might be an irrational real number), because it resembles the method to remove roots from simple expressions in a denominator.

The real and imaginary parts of a complex number  can be extracted using the conjugation:

Moreover, a complex number is real if and only if it equals its own conjugate.

Conjugation distributes over the basic complex arithmetic operations:

Conjugation is also employed in inversive geometry, a branch of geometry studying reflections more general than ones about a line. In the network analysis of electrical circuits, the complex conjugate is used in finding the equivalent impedance when the maximum power transfer theorem is looked for.

Addition and subtraction

That is to say:

Similarly, subtraction can be performed as

Multiplication of a complex number  and a real number  can be done similarly by multiplying separately  and the real and imaginary parts of :

In particular, subtraction can be done by negating the subtrahend (that is multiplying it with ) and adding the result to the minuend:

Multiplication and square
The rules of  the distributive property, the commutative properties (of addition and multiplication), and the defining property  apply to complex numbers. It follows that 

In particular,

Reciprocal and division
Using the conjugation, the reciprocal of a nonzero complex number  can always be broken down to

since non-zero implies that  is greater than zero.

This can be used to express a division of an arbitrary complex number  by a non-zero complex number  as

Multiplication and division in polar form

Formulas for multiplication, division and exponentiation are simpler in polar form than the corresponding formulas in Cartesian coordinates.

we may derive

In other words, the absolute values are multiplied and the arguments are added to yield the polar form of the product. For example, multiplying by  corresponds to a quarter-turn counter-clockwise, which gives back . The picture at the right illustrates the multiplication of

On the other hand, it is also the sum of the angles at the origin of the red and blue triangles are arctan(1/3) and arctan(1/2), respectively. Thus, the formula

holds.

Similarly, division is given by

Square root

and

where  is the signum function. This can be seen by squaring  to obtain .

Exponential function
The exponential function  can be defined for every complex number  by the power series

which has an infinite radius of convergence.

If  is real, one has 

Functional equation
The exponential function satisfies the functional equation 
This can be proved either by comparing the power series expansion of both members or by applying analytic continuation from the restriction of the equation to real arguments.

Euler's formula
Euler's formula states that, for any real number ,

which is the decomposition of the exponential function into its real and imaginary parts.

Complex logarithm
In the real case, the natural logarithm can be defined as the inverse 
 of the exponential function. For extending this to the complex domain, one can start from Euler's formula. It implies that, if a complex number  is written in polar form

with  then with

as complex logarithm one has a proper inverse:

Therefore, if the complex logarithm is not to be defined as a multivalued function

one has to use a branch cut and to restrict the codomain, resulting in the bijective function

Exponentiation
If  is real and  complex, the exponentiation is defined as 

where  denotes the natural logarithm.

It follows that if  is as above, and if  is another complex number, then the exponentiation is the multivalued function

Integer and fractional exponents

Thus, if the exponent  is an integer, then  is well defined, and the exponentiation formula simplifies to de Moivre's formula:

The  th roots of a complex number  are given by

(Here  is the usual (positive) th root of the positive real number .) Because sine and cosine are periodic, other integer values of  do not give other values.

While the th root of a positive real number  is chosen to be the positive real number  satisfying , there is no natural way of distinguishing one particular complex th root of a complex number. This implies that, contrary to the case of positive real numbers, one has  

since the left-hand side consists of  values, and the right-hand side is a single value.

Properties

Field structure
The set  of complex numbers is a field. Briefly, this means that the following facts hold: first, any two complex numbers can be added and multiplied to yield another complex number. Second, for any complex number , its additive inverse  is also a complex number; and third, every nonzero complex number has a reciprocal complex number. Moreover, these operations satisfy a number of laws, for example the law of commutativity of addition and multiplication for any two complex numbers  and :

These two laws and the other requirements on a field can be proven by the formulas given above, using the fact that the real numbers themselves form a field.

Unlike the reals,  is not an ordered field, that is to say, it is not possible to define a relation  that is compatible with the addition and multiplication. In fact, in any ordered field, the square of any element is necessarily positive, so  precludes the existence of an ordering on 

When the underlying field for a mathematical topic or construct is the field of complex numbers, the topic's name is usually modified to reflect that fact. For example: complex analysis, complex matrix, complex polynomial, and complex Lie algebra.

Solutions of polynomial equations
Given any complex numbers (called coefficients) , the equation

has at least one complex solution z, provided that at least one of the higher coefficients  is nonzero. This is the statement of the fundamental theorem of algebra, of Carl Friedrich Gauss and Jean le Rond d'Alembert. Because of this fact,  is called an algebraically closed field.

There are various proofs of this theorem, by either analytic methods such as Liouville's theorem, or topological ones such as the winding number, or a proof combining Galois theory and the fact that any real polynomial of odd degree has at least one real root.

Because of this fact, theorems that hold for any algebraically closed field apply to  For example, any non-empty complex square matrix has at least one (complex) eigenvalue.

Algebraic characterization
The field  has the following three properties:
 First, it has characteristic 0. This means that  for any number of summands (all of which equal one).
 Third, it is algebraically closed (see above).
It can be shown that any field having these properties is isomorphic (as a field) to  For example, the algebraic closure of the field  of the -adic number also satisfies these three properties, so these two fields are isomorphic (as fields, but not as topological fields). Also,  is isomorphic to the field of complex Puiseux series. However, specifying an isomorphism requires the axiom of choice.

Characterization as a topological field
The preceding characterization of  describes only the algebraic aspects of  That is to say, the properties of nearness and continuity, which matter in areas such as analysis and topology, are not dealt with.
  is closed under addition, multiplication and taking inverses.

With this topology  is isomorphic as a topological field to 

Formal construction

Construction as ordered pairs

Construction as a quotient field
Though this low-level construction does accurately describe the structure of the complex numbers, the following equivalent definition reveals the algebraic nature of  more immediately. This characterization relies on the notion of fields and polynomials. A field is a set endowed with addition, subtraction, multiplication and division operations that behave as is familiar from, say, rational numbers. For example, the distributive law

The set  of real numbers does form a field. A polynomial  with real coefficients is an expression of the form

The usual addition and multiplication of polynomials endows the set  of all such polynomials with a ring structure. This ring is called the polynomial ring over the real numbers.

Equivalently, elements of the extension field can be written as ordered pairs  of real numbers. The quotient ring is a field, because  is irreducible over  so the ideal it generates is maximal.

The formulas for addition and multiplication in the ring  modulo the relation , correspond to the formulas for addition and multiplication of complex numbers defined as ordered pairs.  So the two definitions of the field  are isomorphic (as fields).

Matrix representation of complex numbers
Complex numbers  can also be represented by  matrices that have the form:

As the sum and product of two such matrices is again of this form, these matrices form a subring of the ring  matrices.

A simple computation shows that the map:

is a ring isomorphism from the field of complex numbers to the ring of these matrices. This isomorphism associates the square of the absolute value of a complex number with the determinant of the corresponding matrix, and the conjugate of a complex number with the transpose of the matrix.

The geometric description of the multiplication of complex numbers can also be expressed in terms of rotation matrices by using this correspondence between complex numbers and such matrices.

In this case, the action of the matrix on vectors and the multiplication by the complex number  are both the rotation of the angle .

Complex analysis

The study of functions of a complex variable is known as complex analysis and has enormous practical use in applied mathematics as well as in other branches of mathematics. Often, the most natural proofs for statements in real analysis or even number theory employ techniques from complex analysis (see prime number theorem for an example). Unlike real functions, which are commonly represented as two-dimensional graphs, complex functions have four-dimensional graphs and may usefully be illustrated by color-coding a three-dimensional graph to suggest four dimensions, or by animating the complex function's dynamic transformation of the complex plane.

Complex exponential and related functions
The notions of convergent series and continuous functions in (real) analysis have natural analogs in complex analysis. A sequence  of complex numbers is said to converge if and only if its real and imaginary parts do. This is equivalent to the (ε, δ)-definition of limits, where the absolute value of real numbers is replaced by the one of complex numbers. From a more abstract point of view, endowed with the metric

is a complete metric space, which notably includes the triangle inequality

Like in real analysis, this notion of convergence is used to construct a number of elementary functions: the exponential function , also written , is defined as the infinite series

The series defining the real trigonometric functions sine and cosine, as well as the hyperbolic functions sinh and cosh, also carry over to complex arguments without change. For the other trigonometric and hyperbolic functions, such as tangent, things are slightly more complicated, as the defining series do not converge for all complex values. Therefore, one must define them either in terms of sine, cosine and exponential, or, equivalently, by using the method of analytic continuation.

Euler's formula states:

for any real number , in particular
, which is Euler's identity.
Unlike in the situation of real numbers, there is an infinitude of complex solutions  of the equation

for any complex number . It can be shown that any such solution  – called complex logarithm of  – satisfies

where arg is the argument defined above, and ln the (real) natural logarithm. The principal value of log is often taken by restricting the imaginary part to the interval .

Complex exponentiation  is defined as

and is multi-valued, except when  is an integer. For , for some natural number , this recovers the non-uniqueness of th roots mentioned above.

Complex numbers, unlike real numbers, do not in general satisfy the unmodified power and logarithm identities, particularly when naïvely treated as single-valued functions; see failure of power and logarithm identities. For example, they do not satisfy

Both sides of the equation are multivalued by the definition of complex exponentiation given here, and the values on the left are a subset of those on the right.

Holomorphic functions
A function f:  →  is called holomorphic if it satisfies the Cauchy–Riemann equations. For example, any -linear map  →  can be written in the form

This map is holomorphic if and only if . The second summand  is real-differentiable, but does not satisfy the Cauchy–Riemann equations.

Complex analysis shows some features not apparent in real analysis. For example, any two holomorphic functions  and  that agree on an arbitrarily small open subset of  necessarily agree everywhere.

Applications
Complex numbers have applications in many scientific areas, including signal processing, control theory, electromagnetism, fluid dynamics, quantum mechanics, cartography, and vibration analysis. Some of these applications are described below.

Geometry

Shapes
Three non-collinear points  in the plane determine the shape of the triangle . Locating the points in the complex plane, this shape of a triangle may be expressed by complex arithmetic as

The shape  of a triangle will remain the same, when the complex plane is transformed by translation or dilation (by an affine transformation), corresponding to the intuitive notion of shape, and describing similarity. Thus each triangle  is in a similarity class of triangles with the same shape.

Fractal geometry

The Mandelbrot set is a popular example of a fractal formed on the complex plane. It is defined by plotting every location  where iterating the sequence  does not diverge when iterated infinitely. Similarly, Julia sets have the same rules, except where  remains constant.

Triangles
Every triangle has a unique Steiner inellipse – an ellipse inside the triangle and tangent to the midpoints of the three sides of the triangle. Write the cubic equation , take its derivative, and equate the (quadratic) derivative to zero. Marden's theorem says that the solutions of this equation are the complex numbers denoting the locations of the two foci of the Steiner inellipse.

Algebraic number theory

A fortiori, the same is true if the equation has rational coefficients. The roots of such equations are called algebraic numbers – they are a principal object of study in algebraic number theory. In this way, algebraic methods can be used to study geometric questions and vice versa. With algebraic methods, more specifically applying the machinery of field theory to the number field containing roots of unity, it can be shown that it is not possible to construct a regular nonagon using only compass and straightedge – a purely geometric problem.

Analytic number theory

Analytic number theory studies numbers, often integers or rationals, by taking advantage of the fact that they can be regarded as complex numbers, in which analytic methods can be used. This is done by encoding number-theoretic information in complex-valued functions. For example, the Riemann zeta function  is related to the distribution of prime numbers.

Improper integrals
In applied fields, complex numbers are often used to compute certain real-valued improper integrals, by means of complex-valued functions. Several methods exist to do this; see methods of contour integration.

Dynamic equations
In differential equations, it is common to first find all complex roots  of the characteristic equation of a linear differential equation or equation system and then attempt to solve the system in terms of base functions of the form . Likewise, in difference equations, the complex roots  of the characteristic equation of the difference equation system are used, to attempt to solve the system in terms of base functions of the form .

Linear algebra 
Eigendecomposition is a useful tool for computing matrix powers and matrix exponentials. However, it often requires the use of complex numbers, even if the matrix is real (for example, a rotation matrix).

Complex numbers often generalize concepts originally conceived in the real numbers. For example, the conjugate transpose generalizes the transpose, hermitian matrices generalize symmetric matrices, and unitary matrices generalize orthogonal matrices.

In applied mathematics

Control theory

In control theory, systems are often transformed from the time domain to the complex frequency domain using the Laplace transform. The system's zeros and poles are then analyzed in the complex plane. The root locus, Nyquist plot, and Nichols plot techniques all make use of the complex plane.

In the root locus method, it is important whether zeros and poles are in the left or right half planes, that is, have real part greater than or less than zero. If a linear, time-invariant (LTI) system has poles that are

 in the right half plane, it will be unstable,
 all in the left half plane, it will be stable,
 on the imaginary axis, it will have marginal stability.

If a system has zeros in the right half plane, it is a nonminimum phase system.

Signal analysis
Complex numbers are used in signal analysis and other fields for a convenient description for periodically varying signals. For given real functions representing actual physical quantities, often in terms of sines and cosines, corresponding complex functions are considered of which the real parts are the original quantities. For a sine wave of a given frequency, the absolute value  of the corresponding  is the amplitude and the argument  is the phase.

If Fourier analysis is employed to write a given real-valued signal as a sum of periodic functions, these periodic functions are often written as complex-valued functions of the form

and

where ω represents the angular frequency and the complex number A encodes the phase and amplitude as explained above.

This use is also extended into digital signal processing and digital image processing, which use digital versions of Fourier analysis (and wavelet analysis) to transmit, compress, restore, and otherwise process digital audio signals, still images, and video signals.

Another example, relevant to the two side bands of amplitude modulation of AM radio, is:

In physics

Electromagnetism and electrical engineering

In electrical engineering, the Fourier transform is used to analyze varying voltages and currents. The treatment of resistors, capacitors, and inductors can then be unified by introducing imaginary, frequency-dependent resistances for the latter two and combining all three in a single complex number called the impedance. This approach is called phasor calculus.

Since the voltage in an AC circuit is oscillating, it can be represented as

To obtain the measurable quantity, the real part is taken:

The complex-valued signal  is called the analytic representation of the real-valued, measurable signal .

Fluid dynamics
In fluid dynamics, complex functions are used to describe potential flow in two dimensions.

Quantum mechanics
The complex number field is intrinsic to the mathematical formulations of quantum mechanics, where complex Hilbert spaces provide the context for one such formulation that is convenient and perhaps most standard. The original foundation formulas of quantum mechanics – the Schrödinger equation and Heisenberg's matrix mechanics – make use of complex numbers.

Relativity
In special and general relativity, some formulas for the metric on spacetime become simpler if one takes the time component of the spacetime continuum to be imaginary. (This approach is no longer standard in classical relativity, but is used in an essential way in quantum field theory.) Complex numbers are essential to spinors, which are a generalization of the tensors used in relativity.

Generalizations and related notions

It can be carried further to higher dimensions, yielding the quaternions  and octonions  which (as a real vector space) are of dimension 4 and 8, respectively.
In this context the complex numbers have been called the binarions.

Just as by applying the construction to reals the property of ordering is lost, properties familiar from real and complex numbers vanish with each extension. The quaternions lose commutativity, that is,  for some quaternions , and the multiplication of octonions, additionally to not being commutative, fails to be associative:  for some octonions .

By Hurwitz's theorem they are the only ones; the sedenions, the next step in the Cayley–Dickson construction, fail to have this structure.

The Cayley–Dickson construction is closely related to the regular representation of  thought of as an -algebra (an -vector space with a multiplication), with respect to the basis . This means the following: the -linear map

for some fixed complex number  can be represented by a  matrix (once a basis has been chosen). With respect to the basis , this matrix is

that is, the one mentioned in the section on matrix representation of complex numbers above. Any matrix

has the property that its square is the negative of the identity matrix: . Then

is also isomorphic to the field  and gives an alternative complex structure on  This is generalized by the notion of a linear complex structure.

In this ring, the equation  has four solutions.

The field  is the completion of  the field of rational numbers, with respect to the usual absolute value metric. The algebraic closures  of  still carry a norm, but (unlike ) are not complete with respect to it. The completion  of  turns out to be algebraically closed. By analogy, the field is called -adic complex numbers.

The fields   and their finite field extensions, including  are called local fields.

See also

 Algebraic surface
 Circular motion using complex numbers
 Complex-base system
 Complex geometry
 Dual-complex number
 Eisenstein integer
 Euler's identity
 Geometric algebra (which includes the complex plane as the 2-dimensional spinor subspace )
 Unit complex number

Notes

References

Works cited

Further reading

Mathematical

Historical

 
 
 
  — A gentle introduction to the history of complex numbers and the beginnings of complex analysis.
  — An advanced perspective on the historical development of the concept of number.

Composition algebras